Night flying restrictions or night-time curfews, including night flight bans, are any regulations or legislation imposed by a governing body to limit the ground-perceived exposure to aircraft noise pollution during the night hours, when the majority of residents are trying to sleep. Such regulations may include restrictions to available flight paths, or prohibitions against takeoffs, or prohibitions against takeoffs and landings, or prohibitions against ground operations (engine runups or taxiing).

List 

Night flying restrictions are common at airports in Europe. Most airports in Germany have restrictions and curfews during the night. Several night flying restrictions including full night flight bans have been introduced in order to ensure that residents living near airports can sleep at night.
 Budapest Ferenc Liszt International Airport, Hungary: A night flight ban between midnight and 5:00 was introduced in August 2019 by agreement between the city of Budapest and the Ministry of Transport. Nearby residents received a government subsidy to install soundproof windows.
 Cologne Bonn Airport, Germany: In April 2012, the Government of North Rhine-Westphalia introduced a night flight ban for passenger aircraft from midnight until 05:00.
 El Palomar Airport, Argentina: In 2019, an administrative court in Buenos Aires imposed a night-time flight ban.
 Frankfurt Airport, Germany: In October 2011, the Supreme Court of Hesse imposed a ban on night flights between 23:00 and 05:00. This decision was upheld by the Federal Administrative Court in Leipzig in April 2012. During the morning and evening periods (2200-2300 and 0500-0600) a limited number of flights are allowed, providing they comply with ICAO Chapter 4 noise regulations. Further restrictions apply to noisier aircraft.
 London airports: The night restrictions for Heathrow, Gatwick and Stansted define a night period, 2300–0700 hours, and a night quota period, 2330–0600 hours. During the night period, the noisiest types of aircraft (classified as QC/4, QC/8 or QC/16 under the Quota Count system) may not be scheduled to land or to take off (other than in the most exceptional circumstances, such as an emergency landing). In addition, during the night quota period movements by most other types of aircraft (including the new QC/0.25 category) will be restricted by a movements limit and a noise quota, which are set for each season.
 Zurich Airport, Switzerland: A strict night-time curfew has been in force since 29 July 2010 between 23:30 and 6:00; the time between 23:00 and 23:30 may only be used to reduce backlogs of delayed flights.

See also 
 Short-haul flight ban

References

External links 
Night flying restrictions at London airports
Night flying restrictions at Sydney airport

Aircraft noise
Aviation law
night
Night flying